The Acuario Nacional de Cuba (National Aquarium of Cuba) is an aquarium in Havana, Cuba established in 1960 to focus on "research and environmental education". Displays include those of coral and other tropical species, as well as a dolphinarium and sea lion shows.

History

In 1998, the original dolphin show stadium was damaged by a hurricane. A new stadium was built and opened in 2000.

References

External links
Official Website
Soltura Cuba Travel

Buildings and structures in Havana
Research institutes in Cuba
Education in Havana
Aquaria in Cuba
Tourist attractions in Havana
Marine mammal rehabilitation and conservation centers
Dolphinariums

Architecture in Havana